Jitendrabhai Savjibhai Vaghani (born 11 September, 1970) is an Indian politician from Bharatiya Janata Party. He is a member of legislative assembly representing Bhavnagar West in Gujarat Legislative Assembly. He was appointed an education minister when Bhupendra Patel became Chief Minister on September 2021.

Political career

Jitu Vaghani entered electoral politics by unsuccessfully contesting 2007 Gujarat Legislative Assembly election from Bhavnagar (south) assembly constituency against senior Congress leader Shaktisinh Gohil. He lost by margin of over seven thousand votes.

In 2012, Vaghani contested from Bhavnagar (West) Assembly seat, and this time he was successful, winning his seat with highest margin in the entire Saurashtra region. In 2017 Gujarat Legislative Assembly election, he got reelected on the same seat with margin of 27000 votes.

Vaghani was appointed president of BJP's Gujarat state unit in August 2016 following previous president Vijay Rupani's appointment as Chief Minister of Gujarat. Vaghani was succeeded by Chandrakant Raghunath Patil as Gujarat BJP President on 20 July 2020.

On 18 September 2021, he became Cabinet Minister of Gujarat and assumed office as Education (Primary, Secondary, Adult), Higher and Technical Education, Science and Technology minister.

Electoral history

References

External links
 

Bharatiya Janata Party politicians from Gujarat
People from Bhavnagar
Gujarat MLAs 2012–2017
Rashtriya Swayamsevak Sangh members
Gujarat MLAs 2017–2022
1970 births
Living people
Gujarati people
State Presidents of Bharatiya Janata Party